The Boys Are Back may refer to:

The Boys Are Back (Sawyer Brown album), a 1989 album by Sawyer Brown
The Boys Are Back (The Oak Ridge Boys album), a 2009 album by The Oak Ridge Boys
The Boys Are Back (TV series), a 1994 American sitcom
The Boys Are Back (film), a 2009 Australian movie

 "The Boys Are Back", a song from the 2008 film High School Musical 3: Senior Year
 "The Boys Are Back", a cover version in 2008 by US5     

"The Boys Are Back", a song by Dropkick Murphys from their 2013 album Signed and Sealed in Blood

See also
 The Boys Are Back in Town (disambiguation)